Ephialtias velutinum is a moth of the  family Notodontidae. It is found in upper Amazonia (Manaus westward to Peru and Ecuador).

External links
Species page at Tree of Life project

Notodontidae of South America
Moths described in 1878